Black Music Appreciation Month is an annual celebration of African-American music in the United States. It was initiated as Black Music Month by President Jimmy Carter who, on June 7, 1979, decreed that June would be the month of Black music.

In 2009, the commemoration was given its current name by President Barack Obama.  In his 2016 proclamation, Obama noted that African-American music and musicians have helped the country  "to dance, to express our faith through song, to march against injustice, and to defend our country's enduring promise of freedom and opportunity for all."

References

External links
 Celebrating Black Music Month, National Museum of African American History and Culture

Observances in the United States
June observances
African-American music
Commemorative months